This is a sub-article to Białystok
Białystok has a wide variety of media outlets serving the city and surrounding region. There are two locally published daily newspapers, Gazeta Współczesna  (36.3% market share)  and Kurier Poranny (20.3% market share). In addition two national papers have local bureaus. There are a number of national and locally produced television and radio channels available both over-the-air from the nearby RTCN Białystok (Krynice) Mast, the seventh highest structure in Poland, in addition to transmitter sites within the city. There is also a cable television system available within the city. The city has two campus radio stations; Radiosupeł at the Medical University of Białystok and Radio Akadera at the Białystok Technical University.

Newspapers
There are two major newspapers covering the city:
 Gazeta Współczesna; a daily paper with a 36.3% market share
 Kurier Poranny; a daily paper with a 20.3% market share

In addition, there are a number of national newspapers which cover events in the city:
 Rzeczpospolita; a daily paper published in Warsaw
 Gazeta Wyborcza; a daily paper published in Warsaw, but with a bureau in the city and a local edition, (Gazeta Wyborcza Białystok)

There are a number of weekly newspapers covering the city:
 Teraz Białystok; a weekly paper in Polish
 Niva; a weekly paper in Belarusian language
 Czasopis; a weekly paper in Belarusian language
 Przegląd Prawosławny;a monthly magazine discussing Orthodox issues

Television
A number of national and regional channels are available both over-the-air from the nearby RTCN Białystok (Krynice) Mast, the seventh highest structure in Poland, and on cable television: 
 TVP1, Telewizja Polska S.A.; The primary channel of Poland's national public broadcaster.
 TVP2, Telewizja Polska S.A.; An entertainment channel of Poland's national public broadcaster.
 TVP Info/TVP Białystok, Telewizja Polska S.A.; A channel of Poland's national public broadcaster focusing on the regions of Poland. Locally created programming is generated in Białystok.
 Telewizja Jard (dawniej Białostocka Telewizja Miejska - BTM) 
 Podlaska Telewizja (PTV); A privately owned, regional cable channel.

Radio
A number of radio stations are available in the city:
Polskie Radio Program I from Polskie Radio S.A.
Polskie Radio Program III from Polskie Radio S.A.
Białoruskie Radio Racja from Białoruskie Centrum Informacyjne Sp. z o.o.
Polskie Radio Białystok from Regionalna Rozgłośnia w Białymstoku "Radio Białystok" S.A.
RMF FM from Radio Muzyka Fakty Sp. z o.o.
Radio Maryja from the Warsaw Province of the Congregation of the Most Holy Redeemer
Radio ZET from Radio ZET Sp. z o.o.
Radio Jard
Radio Jard II
Radio Eska Białystok – 90,6 FM
Radio VOX FM Białystok – 103,3 MHz
Radio Złote Przeboje - 101,0 MHz
Radio Orthodoxia
Radiosupeł (a Campus radio station at Medical University of Białystok)
Radio Akadera (a Campus radio station at Białystok Technical University) 87,7 MHz 
“Akadera” -  BTU  Radio Station  is a university radio station established in 1964  covering the city of Białystok and the area of 50 km around it. The program of the Station focuses, first of all, on university students and their environment. The Station’ s journalists pay great attention to city life issues especially those concerning young people. “Akadera” Radio program is created by  professional staff in cooperation with student journalists from Bialystok's universities and colleges. It is a commercial station and has been fully licensed since 1994. In 2003 it became a member of a nationwide association of “Polish Academic Radio Stations” embracing all the licensed university radio stations.

References